"The Cattle Call" is a song written and recorded in 1934 by American songwriter and musician Tex Owens. The melody was adapted from Bruno Rudzinksi's 1928 recording "Pawel Walc". It became a signature song for Eddy Arnold. Members of the Western Writers of America chose it as one of the Top 100 Western songs of all time.

Owens wrote the song in Kansas City while watching the snow fall. "Watching the snow, my sympathy went out to cattle everywhere, and I just wished I could call them all around me and break some corn over a wagon wheel and feed them. That's when the words 'cattle call' came to my mind.  I picked up my guitar, and in thirty minutes I had wrote the music and four verses to the song," he said.  He recorded it again in 1936.

Cover versions and later uses
The song was recorded by Eddy Arnold in 1944, Tex Ritter (1947), Carolina Cotton (1951) and Slim Whitman (1954). Whitman's version peaked at number 11 on the C&W Best Seller chart.

In 1955, Eddy Arnold re-recorded the song with Hugo Winterhalter's Chorus and Orchestra, this version spending 26 weeks on the country chart, peaking at number one for two weeks. Arnold recorded a simpler arrangement in 1963 for the title track of a collection of cowboy and western songs.

Other versions were recorded by Billy Walker (1965), Donn Reynolds (1965), Elvis Presley (1970), Gil Trythall (1971), Lenny Breau and Chet Atkins (Standard Brands, 1981), Boxcar Willie (1986), Don Edwards (1992), Emmylou Harris (1992), Skip Gorman (1994), Wylie Gustafson (1994), LeAnn Rimes (1996 with Arnold and on November 16, 1999, Arnold released the recording as a single) and Dwight Yoakam (1998) for the motion picture soundtrack of The Horse Whisperer.
Also performed by the Sons of the Pioneers featuring Ken Curtis in the movie Rio Grande (1950).

The Eddy Arnold version of the song was heard in the 1997 movie Private Parts during the scene when Howard Stern, whose station "W4" in Detroit had just changed formats from rock to country, abruptly resigned on the air telling listeners he didn't understand the music. It was additionally featured in the film My Own Private Idaho.

Notes

References
Montana, Daisy "Cattle Call: from Tex Owens to People Like Us" (April 13, 2009) Mademoiselle Montana's Yodel Heaven

External links
Tex Owens grave site

Songs about cattle
1955 singles
1999 singles
Eddy Arnold songs
Slim Whitman songs
LeAnn Rimes songs
1934 songs